Hugo Hofstetter (born 13 February 1994) is a French cyclist, who currently rides for UCI ProTeam . In August 2020, he was named in the startlist for the 2020 Tour de France. He finished in the top 10 of five stages during the race, including the final stage on the Champs-Élysées.

Major results

2014
 6th Paris–Tours Espoirs
2015
 1st  Road race, National Under-23 Road Championships
 3rd Paris–Roubaix Espoirs
2016
 7th La Roue Tourangelle
 9th Classic Loire Atlantique
2017
 3rd Classic Loire-Atlantique
 5th Grand Prix de la Somme
 10th Tro-Bro Léon
2018
 1st Overall UCI Europe Tour
 1st Overall French Road Cycling Cup
 1st Stage 1 Tour de l'Ain
 2nd Grand Prix de Denain
 2nd Cholet-Pays de la Loire
 3rd Nokere Koerse
 3rd La Roue Tourangelle
 3rd Elfstedenronde
 4th Clásica de Almería
 4th Tro-Bro Léon
 4th Halle–Ingooigem
 4th Polynormande
 6th Classic Loire-Atlantique
 8th Three Days of Bruges–De Panne
 8th Route Adélie
 8th Grand Prix de Fourmies
 9th Paris–Camembert
2019
 2nd Grote Prijs Jef Scherens
 3rd Trofeo Palma
 4th Scheldeprijs
 4th Halle–Ingooigem
 5th Eschborn–Frankfurt
 5th Ronde van Drenthe
 5th Nokere Koerse
 9th Grote Prijs Marcel Kint
 10th Grand Prix de Fourmies
2020
 1st Le Samyn
 6th Kuurne–Brussels–Kuurne
2021
 4th Grand Prix de Denain
 4th Grand Prix de Fourmies
 4th Binche–Chimay–Binche
 5th Le Samyn
 5th Eurométropole Tour
 5th Gooikse Pijl
 6th Classic Brugge–De Panne
 6th Trofeo Alcúdia – Port d'Alcúdia
2022
 1st Tro-Bro Léon
 2nd Bredene Koksijde Classic
 2nd Le Samyn
 3rd Kuurne–Brussels–Kuurne
 3rd Grote Prijs Jean-Pierre Monseré
 3rd Ronde van Drenthe
 4th Trofeo Playa de Palma
 4th Paris–Chauny
 6th Overall Four Days of Dunkirk
 7th Nokere Koerse
 8th BEMER Cyclassics
 8th Rund um Köln
 10th Paris–Tours
2023
 2nd Le Samyn

Grand Tour general classification results timeline

References

External links

 
 

1994 births
Living people
French male cyclists
Sportspeople from Haut-Rhin
Cyclists from Grand Est